Enterprise is a city in the southeastern part of Coffee County and the southwestern part of Dale County in Southeastern Alabama, United States. Its population was 28,711 at the 2020 census. Enterprise is the primary city of the Enterprise micropolitan statistical area (with the portion of the city in Dale County part of the Ozark micropolitan statistical area). It was originally a part of Enterprise–Ozark micropolitan area before being split; for a longer while it was originally part of the Dothan-Enterprise-Ozark combined statistical area but is now its own separate primary statistical area in later censuses.

Enterprise is famous for the Boll Weevil Monument, a large monument of a woman holding a boll weevil, in the middle of Main Street. The city erected the statue because the destruction of the cotton crop by the boll weevil had led to agricultural diversity, starting with peanuts and more prosperity than had ever come from cotton alone. It is the only statue to an insect pest in the world. Enterprise is right outside the U.S. Army's Fort Rucker, the home of Army Aviation.

Enterprise is home to Enterprise State Community College.

History

Founding and the Boll Weevil Monument

The founder of Enterprise, John Henry Carmichael, first settled there in 1881. Carmichael opened a store, which attracted more settlers to the area, and by the next year, a post office was relocated from the settlement of Drake Eye to the north to Enterprise. In 1896, with 250 people having settled there, the city of Enterprise incorporated. Soon afterward, the Alabama Midland Railway came to Enterprise, bringing with it opportunities for commerce and growth. By 1906, its population had grown to 3,750.

Enterprise's way of life came under threat in 1915. An infestation of boll weevils found its way into the region's cotton crops, resulting in the destruction of most of the cotton in Coffee County. Facing economic ruin, the nearly bankrupt area farmers were forced to diversify, planting peanuts and other crops in an effort to lessen the damage and recoup some of their losses.

Two years later, Coffee County was the United States' leading producer of peanuts. Not only did Enterprise stave off disaster, but its economy was renewed by the thriving new crop base. In appreciation, the people of Enterprise erected a monument in the city center to what the monument calls their "herald of prosperity", the boll weevil. The Boll Weevil Monument was dedicated on December 11, 1919, as a reminder of how the city adjusted in the face of adversity. It is the only monument to an agricultural pest in the world.

March 2007 tornado

In the early afternoon of March 1, 2007, Enterprise was hit by a devastating tornado (rated EF4) during the February–March 2007 tornado outbreak. The tornado caused nine deaths, injured over 121 others, and left severe damage in the city estimated at nearly $307,000,000, the worst disaster in Enterprise history.

The worst damage occurred at Enterprise High School, where eight students died after a hallway was almost completely destroyed. The students were Michael Bowen (16), Andrew (AJ) Jackson (16), Ryan Mohler (16), Peter Dunn lll (16), Michael (Mikey) Tompkins (17), Jamie Vidensek (17), Michelle Wilson (16) and Kathryn Strunk (16); the remaining casualty was resident Edna Strickland. A quarter mile-wide swath through the downtown area was devastated, with at least 370 houses damaged or destroyed. The National Guard was called into the city; a dusk-to-dawn curfew was implemented immediately after the disaster. President Bush, who arrived the morning of March 3, declared the county a disaster area. An AmeriCorps team was sent to the city to help organize and participate in disaster relief.

The high school was to be relocated to the west end of Boll Weevil Circle. It was due to be rebuilt by the 2010–11 school year at a cost over $80,000,000. Until then, the students were required to go to school at the local community college, where trailers were used to add classrooms. The high school was rebuilt and reopened on August 23, 2010.

Demographics

2020

As of the 2020 United States census, there were 28,711 people, 10,744 households, and 7,461 families residing in the city.

2010
As of the 2010 census, 26,562 people, 10,513 households, and 7,196 families resided in the city. The 11,616 housing units averaged 371.1 per mi2 (143.2/km2). The racial makeup of the city was 69.4% White, 20.7% Black or African American, 0.5% Native American, 2.0% Asian, 0.3% Pacific Islander, 4.1% from other races, and 2.9% from two or more races. Hispanics or Latinos of any race were 8.8% of the population.

Of the 10,513 households, 32.2% had children under the age of 18 living with them, 50.3% were married couples living together, 13.9% had a female householder with no husband present, and 31.6% were not families. About 25.6% of all households were made up of individuals, and 8.5% had someone living alone who was 65 years of age or older. The average household size was 2.50, and the average family size was 3.00.

In the city, the age distribution was 25.4% under 18, 9.3% from 18 to 24, 29.1% from 25 to 44, 23.3% from 45 to 64, and 12.9% who were 65 years or older. The median age was 34.2 years. For every 100 females, there were 96.2 males. For every 100 females aged 18 and over, there were 99.6 males.

The median income for a household in the city was $48,042, and the median income for a family was $63,036. Males had a median income of $45,556 versus $31,588 for females. The per capita income for the city was $25,185. About 13.9% of families and 15.6% of the population were below the poverty line, including 23.7% of those under age 18 and 12.9% of those age 65 or over.

2000
As of the 2000 census, 21,178 people, 8,533 households, and 5,973 families were residing in the city. The 9,641 housing units averaged . The racial makeup of the city was 71.62% White, 22.95% African American, 0.48% Native American, 1.60% Asian, 0.16% Pacific Islander, 1.27% from other races, and 1.92% from two or more races. Hispanics or Latinos of any race were 3.88% of the population.

Of the 8,533 households, 33.1% had children under the age of 18 living with them, 53.6% were married couples living together, 13.3% had a female householder with no husband present, and 30.0% were not families. About 25.7% of all households were made up of individuals, and 9.5% had someone living alone who was 65 years of age or older. The average household size was 2.45 and the average family size was 2.95.

In the city, the age distribution was 25.4% under 18, 9.3% from 18 to 24, 27.5% from 25 to 44, 23.8% from 45 to 64, and 14.1% who were 65 years or older. The median age was 37 years. For every 100 females, there were 91.3 males. For every 100 females aged 18 and over, there were 86.8 males.

The median income for a household in the city was $37,661, and for a family was $45,510. Males had a median income of $37,131 versus $20,560 for females. The per capita income for the city was $20,493. About 10.4% of families and 13.4% of the population were below the poverty line, including 21.0% of those under age 18 and 11.1% of those age 65 or over.

Education
Enterprise is served by Enterprise City Schools. It is also home to Enterprise State Community College, formerly known as Enterprise State Junior College. A two-year college, the Enterprise campus is home to the Boll Weevils.

Point of interest

Murals were produced from 1934 to 1943 in the United States through the Section of Painting and Sculpture, later called the Section of Fine Arts, of the Treasury Department. Paul Theodore Arlt was an artist with the Section of Fine Arts and painted the post office mural, The Section, in the Enterprise post office in 1941. The post office was torn down in 1991, but Arlt's mural, Saturday in Enterprise was preserved and now hangs in the Enterprise Public Library.

Weevil Way is a community art project with a series of more than 25 boll weevil statues decorated or dressed to represent the local landmarks or businesses where they stand.

Media
A weekly newspaper, The Southeast Sun, had been published since 1982 but is no longer publishing. The Enterprise Ledger is published Tuesday–Friday and Sunday and has been in circulation since 1898.

Music
The song "Your Guardian Angel" by The Red Jumpsuit Apparatus is dedicated to the eight students who lost their lives when a tornado hit the high school. The twister claimed 9 lives and destroyed Enterprise High School. The song "Held In His Love" by The Springs (band) was written by Stewart Halcomb, a student inside Enterprise High School on March 1, 2007, and dedicated to the eight friends he lost that day.

BamaJam
Enterprise was home to the BamaJam Music Festival featuring multiple acts performing on different stages in three days. Attendance has reached as high as 100,000 each night. In 2008, headliners included Hank Williams, Jr., ZZ Top, Lynyrd Skynyrd, and Trace Adkins, and in 2009, headliners included Taylor Swift, Blake Shelton, Charlie Daniels, Alan Jackson, Brooks and Dunn, The Black Crowes, and Kid Rock.

BamaJam 2011 was cancelled, but the show returned to BamaJam Farms in June 2012 with Eric Church, Tim McGraw, Ronnie Milsap, Alan Jackson, the Zac Brown Band, Sheryl Crow, and Kid Rock.

Notable people
Kendrick Adams, NFL outside linebacker
T. J. Barnes, NFL player
Katie Britt, Alabama Republican Senator
Ethel Cain, American singer-songwriter
Curly Chalker, country and jazz pedal steel guitarist
Clint Crisher, R&B singer
Juli Crockett, retired professional boxer, playwright, and theater director
Brendan Donovan, Baseball player for the St. Louis Cardinals
Jimmy DuBose, former NFL player
Terry Everett, former representative from Alabama's 2nd congressional district
Mark Fuller, federal judge for U. S. District Court, Middle District of Alabama
Kenneth A. Gibson, former mayor of Newark, New Jersey
Stewart Halcomb of The Springs (band)
David Howard, former NFL linebacker
April Hunter, professional wrestler and model
Jamey Johnson, country music artist born in Enterprise
Marcus Jones, college football player for the Houston Cougars, 2021 Paul Hornung Award winner 
Jimmy McClain, NFL player
Michael McDowell, screenwriter and author of several Southern Gothic novels
Ben Paschal, reserve outfielder for the 1927 Yankees
Thomas Virgil Pittman, former federal judge on the United States District Court for the Southern District of Alabama and the United States District Court for the Middle District of Alabama
Cedric Smith, former NFL running back
Aud Tuten, former NHL player with the Chicago Black Hawks (1941–43)
Mark Wilkerson, lead singer of Course of Nature and husband of Melissa Joan Hart

Geography 

Enterprise is located at 31° 19′ 39″ N, 85° 50′ 40″ W (31.3275 N, -85.844444 W).

Major highways that run through the city include U.S. Route 84 and Alabama State Routes 27, 134, and 167. US 84 runs through the northern part of the city along Boll Weevil Circle, leading northwest  to Elba, the Coffee County seat, and east  to Daleville. SR 167 runs north to south on the eastern side of the city on Boll Weevil Circle, leading north  to SR 87 south of Troy and southeast  to Hartford. SR 134 runs west  to Opp.

Climate 

The climate in this area is characterized by hot, humid summers and generally mild winters. According to the Köppen Climate Classification system, Enterprise has a humid subtropical climate, abbreviated "Cfa" on climate maps. The temperatures are moderated by its proximity to the Gulf Coast, and is part of the Wiregrass Region of Southern Alabama, Georgia, and Florida. The temperatures are usually not dissimilar from the Florida panhandle area.

It is located in USDA Plant Hardiness Zone 8B with an average minimum temperature of 15 to 20 (F). As a result of its mild to warm climate, palm trees such as Butia capitata, Sabal palmetto, Phoenix canariensis, Cycas revoluta, and Trachycarpus fortunei are widely grown throughout the city.
Hurricanes and Tornadoes are common here as occasionally hurricanes can reach as far inland as Enterprise and tornadoes also can exist in Enterprise.  Hurricane Eloise (1975) and Hurricane Opal (1995) caused extensive damage to the city.

References

External links

City of Enterprise official website
Enterprise Chamber of Commerce
Enterprise Public Library
The Enterprise Ledger

 
Cities in Alabama
Cities in Coffee County, Alabama
Cities in Dale County, Alabama
Enterprise–Ozark micropolitan area
Populated places established in 1896
1896 establishments in Alabama